Get Out My Head can refer to:

 "Get Out My Head" (Redlight song) (2012)
 "Get Out My Head" (Shane Codd song) (2019)

See also
 Get Out of My Head (disambiguation)